Monca is a genus of skipper butterflies in the family Hesperiidae.

Species
Recognised species in the genus Monca include: 
 Monca crispinus (Plötz, 1882)

References

Natural History Museum Lepidoptera genus database

Hesperiinae
Hesperiidae genera